Michael James Dawes (born 23 February 1992) is an English former first-class cricketer.

Dawes was born at Epsom in February 1992. He was educated at City of London Freemen's School, before going up to Jesus College, Cambridge. From Cambridge, he studied for his PhD in economics at the University of Oxford. While studying at Oxford, he made two appearances in first-class cricket for Oxford University in The University Matches of 2016 and 2018 against Cambridge University. He took 2 wickets in these matches.

References

External links

1992 births
Living people
People from Epsom
People educated at City of London Freemen's School
Alumni of Jesus College, Cambridge
Alumni of the University of Oxford
English cricketers
Oxford University cricketers